Xu Xian is a mythological figure in Chinese folklore, best known for being one of the main characters of the Legend of the White Snake, one of China's four great folk tales. The story has been adapted many times, including into Chinese operas, films, television series and other media. In some versions of the legend he is a scholar, while in others he is a physician. In earlier works such as Feng Menglong's Stories to Caution the World, he is known as Xu Xuan.

Legend
Some legends say that Xu Xian and Bai Suzhen were actually immortals who fell in love and were banished from Heaven because celestial laws forbade their romance. They are reincarnated as a male human and a white snake spirit who lived in the mountains and take a human form after a thousand years. Respectively, their story begins.

During the Qingming Festival, he coincidentally met Bai Suzhen at the Broken Bridge, and he eventually gets married to her. They have a child together but, their happiness is short-lived when a Buddhist abbot Fahai discovers her true origin, and exposes Bai Suzhen to be a snake. Xu Xian is mortified to find his wife has been a snake, and dies of a heart attack. Bai Suzhen finds the cure to revive Xu Xian at Mount Emei. After she revives him, Xu Xian confesses that he still loves Bai Suzhen. Bai Suzhen then fights for both her marriage and her freedom. At last, Fahai tracks them down, defeats Bai Suzhen and imprisons her in Leifeng Pagoda. He spends decades of his life trying to free her, but fails. So, he becomes monk to stay at the temple waiting for his wife. He grows old and eventually dies. Their son finds a way to free her. He destroys the Leifeng Pagoda, and she is released. Bai Suzhen is heart broken to learn that her husband has died, but lives with their son. Fahai, is punished severely by the gods for not recognizing good and bad.

Media adaptations

References

Citations

Sources 

 Chen, Rachel (2010). "Four Chinese Legends". A recent narration along with three other legends. 
 

Legend of the White Snake characters
Chinese gods
Fictional characters from Zhejiang